is a Japanese journalist, the editor-in-chief for the magazine Insider. He graduated from Waseda University with a major in philosophy and is a former member of the Japan Socialist Party.

References 
The original article was written based on the corresponding Japanese Wikipedia article, retrieved on 2008-05-01.

External links 
 Personal page

Japanese journalists
1944 births
Living people
Waseda University alumni